Sool is an administrative region (gobol) in south eastern Somaliland/north western Somalia. It borders Togdheer to the west, Sanaag to the north, Ethiopia to the south and Nugal, Bari to the east. Its capital city is Las Anod. The region is disputed by the self-declared Republic of Somaliland and Puntland, a Federal Member State of Somalia. The region is partially controlled by both polities.

Territorial dispute

Sool is disputed by Somaliland and Puntland. The former basis its claim on the British Somaliland protectorate borders, and the later on the territory inhabited by the Harti clan that established the state in 1998. Khatumo State and its predecessor SSC Movement which rejected both claims also made attempts to establish a separate administration in the region.

In 2003, Puntland sent troops to Las Anod under the pretext of conflict mediation and occupied it outright. Somaliland and Puntland were in conflict west of Las Anod. In 2007, Somaliland took military control of Las Anod. Somaliland and Puntland were in conflict near Tukaraq. In 2018, the Somaliland army captured Tukaraq. In April 2019, the Somaliland army took control of Taleh. In May 2022 Somaliland captured Bo'ame, the last town in the region outside of Somaliland control.

Due to the prolonged conflict between Somaliland and Puntland, many Dhulbahante and Warsangeli living in the region do not recognize the Sool region and eastern Sanaag, as either Somaliland or Puntland.

History

From 1944 to 1974, the Sool region was formerly Las Anod district. It was one of three districts under British protection. The other two districts were the Burao and hargeysa districts.

In 1974 most Sool was part of the larger Nugaal region, with its capital at Garowe. It was established as a separate region in 1984 with its capital at Las Anod.

Demographics

The Sool region is almost exclusively inhabited by Dhulbahante. Michael Walls reports:
 "The residents of Sool overwhelmingly hail from a single clan grouping in the form of the Dhulbahante [...]. Sool boasts a degree of kinship homogeneity that is rare even in the Somali Horn". The Habr Je'lo clan of the Isaaq clan-family make up the vast majority of the population in western Sool, including the region's second largest town Aynaba, as well as the wider Aynaba District.

The Habr Yunis sub-division of the Garhajis Isaaq also inhabit the western parts of Hudun and Las Anod districts in northern Sool.

The Dhulbahante sub-division of the Harti Darod clan primarily inhabits the Taleh, eastern Hudun and Las Anod districts in eastern Sool. The Fiqishini sub-clan of the Habar Gidir Hawiye integrated into Baho Nugaaled Dhulbahante, inhabit the area around Adhi'adeye.

Districts
The Sool region consists of 4 districts.

Villages
 

Karindabaylweyn

Map

See also
Administrative divisions of Somaliland
Regions of Somaliland
Districts of Somaliland
Somalia–Somaliland border

References

External links
Administrative map of Sool

 
Regions of Somaliland